Tsakalidis is a Greek surname. Notable people with the surname include:

Athanasios Tsakalidis (born 1950), Greek computer scientist
Jake Tsakalidis (born 1979), Georgian/Greek basketball player who played in the National Basketball Association

Greek-language surnames
Surnames